Adolf Jakeš (born 20 May 1943) is a Czech sports shooter. He competed for Czechoslovakia in two events at the 1980 Summer Olympics.

References

1943 births
Living people
Czech male sport shooters
Olympic shooters of Czechoslovakia
Shooters at the 1980 Summer Olympics
Sportspeople from České Budějovice